Events from the year 1836 in Sweden

Incumbents
 Monarch – Charles XIV John

Events

Births
 21 March – Bertha Tammelin, operatic mezzo soprano   (died 1915) 
 24 March – Eufrosyne Abrahamson, Swedish soprano (died 1869) 
 12 October - Lars Olsson Smith, politician and manufacturer (died 1913) 
 22 September - Fredrique Paijkull, educational reformer (died 1899) 
 Hilda Caselli, educational reformer (died 1903)
 Therese Kamph, educational reformer (died 1884)

Deaths
 28 February - Aurora Liljenroth, scholar (born 1772) 
 6 March  - Henriette Löfman, composer  (born 1784) 
 2 December – Carl von Rosenstein, archbishop  (born 1766)
 Caroline Gother, banker (born 1761)

References

 
Years of the 19th century in Sweden
Sweden